Dianne Hayter, Baroness Hayter of Kentish Town (born 7 September 1949) is a British politician serving as a Member of the House of Lords since 2010. A member of the Labour and Co-operative Party, she was Shadow Deputy Leader of the House of Lords from 2017 to 2021.

Hayter represented Socialist Societies on the National Executive Committee of the Labour Party from 1998 to 2010, chairing the committee from 2007 to 2008. She served in numerous opposition front bench roles in the Lords from 2011 until 2021, when she became Chair of the International Agreements Committee.

Early life
She is the daughter of Flt Lt Alec Bristow Hayter (died 1972), and Nancy Evans (died 1959). Educated at Trevelyan College, Durham University, where she studied Social and Public Administration (BA), she gained a doctorate at London University in 2004.

Professional career
Hayter was a Director of Alcohol Concern from 1984 to 1990, and Director of Corporate Affairs for the Wellcome Trust from 1996 to 1999.

She served as a board member of a number of organisations, including the Financial Reporting Council's Board of Actuarial Standards, the Determinations Panel of The Pensions Regulator, the Surveying Ombudsman Service, and the Insolvency Practices Council. Hayter chaired the Legal Services Consumer Panel, and was formerly vice chairman of the Financial Services Authority Consumer Panel and chair of the Consumer Panel of the Bar Standards Board. She was a JP from 1976 to 1990.

Political career
Hayter was the General Secretary of the Fabian Society between 1976 and 1982 and Chief Executive of the European Parliamentary Labour Party during 1990 to 1996. 

She sat on Labour's National Executive Committee from 1998 to 2010 and chaired it in 2007–08.

The Labour History Archive and Study Centre at the People's History Museum in Manchester holds the personal papers of Dianne Hayter in their collection, spanning the period from the late 1970s to 2010.

House of Lords
On 22 June 2010, she was created a life peer as Baroness Hayter of Kentish Town, of Kentish Town in the London Borough of Camden, and was introduced in the House of Lords the same day.

She was an Opposition Whip from October 2011 to September 2015.

Between 2012 and 2021, Hayter discontinuously served as a Shadow Spokesperson for the following departments:

 Business, Innovation and Skills, later Business, Energy and Industrial Strategy
 Cabinet Office
 Digital, Culture, Media and Sport
 Exiting the European Union
 Wales
 Women and Equalities

She was elected Deputy leader of Labour in the Lords in June 2017.

She is a member of Labour Friends of Israel.

In July 2019, she was sacked as Shadow Brexit Spokesperson for making what Labour called "deeply offensive" remarks at a Labour First meeting. Hayter asserted that the party's leadership was not open to external views and compared them to being "in a bunker" like the "last days of Hitler".

Personal life
Dianne Hayter lives in Kentish Town, London with her husband, Professor (Anthony) David Caplin, whom she married in 1994.

Publications
Hayter has written Fabian Tract no. 451—The Labour Party: Crisis and Prospects (September 1977), Fightback—Labour's traditional right in the 1970s and 1980s (2005), and Men Who Made Labour—Celebrating the Centenary of the Parliamentary Labour Party (2006) (with Lord Haworth).

The Labour Party: crisis and prospects (Fabian Soc.), 1977;
(contrib.) Labour in the Eighties, 1980;
(contrib.) Prime Minister Portillo and Other Things that Never Happened, 2003;
Fightback!: Labour's Traditional Right in the 1970s and 1980s, 2005;
(ed jtly with Lord Haworth) Men Who Made Labour, 2006;
(contrib.) From the Workhouse to Welfare, 2009.

References

External links
Labour Party profile
National Consumer Council profile
Fightback!: Labour's Traditional Right in the 1970s and 1980s, Dianne Hayter, 2005, 

1949 births
Living people
Alumni of Trevelyan College, Durham
Life peeresses created by Elizabeth II
Politicians from London
British feminists
British socialist feminists
Labour Party (UK) life peers
Life peers created by Elizabeth II
People from Kentish Town
Place of birth missing (living people)
Chairs of the Labour Party (UK)
General Secretaries of the Fabian Society
Chairs of the Fabian Society
Labour Friends of Israel